The Rut is an international skyrunning competition held for the first time in 2013. It runs every year in Big Sky, Montana (United States) in September and consists of four races, a 50 K, a 25 K, a 11 K (from 2015, before was 12 K) and Vertical Kilometer both valid for the Skyrunner World Series.

50 K

28 K / 25 K

11 K / 12 K

Lone Peak Vertical Kilometer

See also 
 Skyrunner World Series

References

External links 
 Official web site

Skyrunning competitions
Skyrunner World Series
Running in Montana
Vertical kilometer running competitions